Mehmed Hâdî Pasha (1861 – 1932) was an Ottoman general, statesman, and a member of the Liberal Union. He was born in Baghdad c. 1861. 

Early in his military career, he was posted to Yemen, where he led the campaign against El-Idrisi's (and other) uprisings. He was decorated for his service there, and emerged with the rank of General and the title of Pasha.  

In 1909, Hadi Pasha was declared governer (vali) of Kosovo Vilayet. 

He was General Chief-of-Staff during the Balkan Wars of 1912-13 during which he successfully defended Istanbul against the Serbs. He retired from the Military before the First World War and served as a Senator and a cabinet minister twice (for Education and Agriculture).  

Hadi Pasha was sent to Paris in 1921 to negotiate and sign the famous Treaty of Sevres, along with Resat Halis and Reza Tevfik. 

Because of his role in this, Hadi Pasha was considered one of the 150 persona non grata of the Republic, along with the other signatories of the treaty and the imperial family itself. He was thereafter exiled to Berat, Albania, where he died in 1936.

References

1861 births
1932 deaths
personae non gratae of, 150
People from Baghdad
Politicians of the Ottoman Empire